is a manga series written and illustrated by Shotaro Ishinomori. A two-season tokusatsu series titled Android Kikaider (Kikaider 01 in season 2) was produced by Toei Company and Ishimori Productions in early 1970s. A 18-episode anime series based on the manga was created by Radix in early 2000s. The tokusatsu series from 1972 is especially popular in Hawaii.

The anime series aired in the United States on Cartoon Network’s Adult Swim Action in 2003. The complete DVD series is available with English subtitles through JN Productions.

Publication
The manga series was serialized in Bessatsu Shōnen Sunday (and later Weekly Shōnen Sunday) from 1972 to 1974, with its chapters collected into 6 tankōbon volumes.

A remake of the original manga called  showing more detailed illustrations compared to the simple design of the original manga was released with a total of 7 tankōbon volumes published by Kadokawa Shoten. The story was written and illustrated by Meimu. The manga was licensed by CMX Manga for the English version.

The manga serves as an alternate sequel to Kikaider: Code 02. The manga was based on Inazuman chapter "The Boy with the Guitar" and follows mainly Inazuman's story.

Volumes
Original series

Adaptations

Tokusatsu
Android Kikaider (1972) (TV series and film)
Kikaider 01 (1973) (TV series)
Mechanical Violator Hakaider (1995) (spin-off film)
Kamen Rider Gaim (2014) (TV series where Kikaider appears in one episode as part of a crossover)
Kikaider Reboot (2014) (film)

Anime
Android Kikaider: The Animation (2000–01) (TV series)
Kikaider 01: The Animation (2001) (4-part OVA)
The Boy Who Carried a Guitar: Kikaider Vs. Inazuman (2002) (OVA special)

Superhero safety
In the past, the Super Giant movie series and shows like Moonlight Mask (the first TV superhero in Japan) became controversial when younger viewers began imitating the stunts performed. The original Android Kikaider series was one of the first tokusatsu superhero TV shows to add safety bumpers at the end of each episode, warning viewers not to imitate the stunts performed by its superhero.

References

External links
TV.com show details 
Official Site

2000 anime television series debuts
2003 anime OVAs
Bandai Entertainment anime titles
Robot superheroes
Japanese drama television series
Mecha anime and manga
Shotaro Ishinomori
Toei tokusatsu

pt:Kikaider